Héctor Rodolfo Baley (born 16 November 1950 in Bahía Blanca) is an Argentine former professional football goalkeeper.

Baley was a goalkeeper in Argentina's 1978 FIFA World Cup winning squad and also in the 1982 tournament. Given goalkeeper Ubaldo Fillol's consistent performances, he ended up playing only a few matches for the national team.

His career started in the Zubeldía era of Estudiantes de La Plata, where he was one of several goalkeepers who tried to fill in for suspended Alberto Poletti.

In 1978 Baley was part of the Independiente team that won the Nacional championship of 1978.

He also played for Huracán, Colón de Santa Fe, and for Talleres de Córdoba, where he was badly injured during the last game of the 1982–83 season (the game that handed the championship to Estudiantes, the team he started his career with). His replacement in that game was Ángel Comizzo, who made his debut.

Honours

Club
Independiente
 Primera División: 1978 Nacional

International
Argentina
 FIFA World Cup: 1978

References

External links
 
 
 

1950 births
Living people
Sportspeople from Buenos Aires Province
Afro-Argentine sportspeople
Argentine footballers
Association football goalkeepers
Estudiantes de La Plata footballers
Club Atlético Colón footballers
Club Atlético Huracán footballers
Club Atlético Independiente footballers
Talleres de Córdoba footballers
Argentine Primera División players
1978 FIFA World Cup players
1982 FIFA World Cup players
FIFA World Cup-winning players
Argentina international footballers